Trevor Dennison (born 31 December 1956) is a South African cricketer. He played in one List A match for Border in 1977/78.

See also
 List of Border representative cricketers

References

External links
 

1956 births
Living people
South African cricketers
Border cricketers
Cricketers from Cape Town